Nazarro is a surname. Notable people with the name include:

Cliff Nazarro (1904–1961), American actor and comedian
Ray Nazarro (1902–1986), American film and television director, producer, and screenwriter

See also
Navarro (surname)
Nazzaro

Surnames of Italian origin